Troglocoelotes is a genus of east Asian funnel weavers. It was first described by B. Li, Z. Zhao and C. T. Zhang in 2019, and it has only been found in China.

Species
 it contains nine species:
T. bailongensis Zhao & S. Q. Li, 2019 – China
T. banmenensis Zhao & S. Q. Li, 2019 – China
T. liangensis Zhao & S. Q. Li, 2019 – China
T. nongchiensis Zhao & S. Q. Li, 2019 – China
T. proximus (Chen, Zhu & Kim, 2008) – China
T. qixianensis Zhao & S. Q. Li, 2019 – China
T. tortus (Chen, Zhu & Kim, 2008) – China
T. yosiianus (Nishikawa, 1999) – China
T. yumiganensis Zhao & S. Q. Li, 2019 (type) – China

See also
 Draconarius
 Coelotes
 List of Agelenidae species

References

Further reading

Agelenidae genera
Spiders of China